Caligula is 2006 German-language opera by Detlev Glanert in four acts to a libretto by Hans-Ulrich Treichel, freely adapted from the 1945 play by Albert Camus. The published version by Boosey & Hawkes also includes an English version by Amanda Holden. The plot of Camus' play tells of the last days of Caligula.

Roles

Recording
Caligula – Ashley Holland (Caligula), Michaela Schuster (Caesonia), Martin Wölfel (Helicon), and Dietrich Volle (Mereia/Lepidus), Barbara Zechmeister (Livia), Hans-Jürgen Lazar (Mucius), Frankfurter Opern- und Museumsorchester, Markus Stenz, Oehms 2012

References

2006 operas
German-language operas
Operas
Operas based on plays
Operas based on real people
Operas set in the 1st century
Cultural depictions of Julia Drusilla
Cultural depictions of Caligula